Cardiff was a parliamentary constituency centred on the town of Cardiff in South Wales which returned one Member of Parliament to the House of Commons from 1542 until it was abolished for the 1918 general election.

Boundaries
Under the Laws in Wales Acts 1535 and 1542, most Welsh shire towns returned one MP, including Cardiff as the shire town of Glamorgan; however, other ancient boroughs in the shire contributed to the expense of the borough MP and in return gained a share in the vote. In the case of Cardiff, the relevant "contributory boroughs" were Llantrisant and Cowbridge, and until 1832 also Swansea, Loughor, Neath, Aberavon, and Kenfig. Elections were often held at Bridgend, which was not a contributory borough but was conveniently central in Glamorgan. The Reform Act 1832 separated the contributory boroughs other than Llantrisant and Cowbridge into the new Swansea District of Boroughs. As proposed in 1830, the reform bill would have added Llandaff, Aberdare, and Merthyr Tydfil as Cardiff contributory boroughs, but in the event Merthyr and Aberdare became a separate borough while Llandaff remained part of Glamorgan county constituency, which gained a second seat. The Parliamentary Boundaries Act 1832 extended the boundary of the Cardiff District of Boroughs constituency to include those parts of the Cardiff parishes of St Mary's and St. John outside the old borough boundary. The Redistribution of Seats Act 1885 extended the parliamentary boundary to Cardiff's enlarged municipal borough boundary.

Members of Parliament

MPs 1542–1645

MPs 1645–1832

MPs 1832–1918

Election results

Elections in the 1830s

Nicholl was appointed as a Lord Commissioner of the Treasury, causing a by-election.

Elections in the 1840s

Nicholl was appointed Judge Advocate General of the Armed Forces, requiring a by-election.

Elections in the 1850s

Elections in the 1860s

Elections in the 1870s

Elections in the 1880s

Reed was appointed a Lord Commissioner of the Treasury, requiring a by-election.

Elections in the 1890s

Elections in the 1900s

Elections in the 1910s

References 

W R Williams The Parliamentary History of the Principality of Wales

Bibliography
 

Politics of Cardiff
History of Glamorgan
Historic parliamentary constituencies in South Wales
Constituencies of the Parliament of the United Kingdom established in 1542
Constituencies of the Parliament of the United Kingdom disestablished in 1918